John Fallon (29 April 1913 – 7 December 1985) was a Scottish professional golfer whose career spanned the years either side of World War II. He was born in Lanark, Scotland. Although never a winner of a major tournament of note, Fallon often contended with high finishes – he lost the final of the 1954 British PGA Matchplay Championship, and was perhaps most unlucky that he missed out on a potential Open Championship that might have been played at St Andrews during the war years. He had placed third there in 1939, and then second in 1955, each time by just a handful of strokes.

Fallon played on the 1955 Ryder Cup team and in 1963 he was non-playing captain of the Great Britain Ryder Cup team.

Professional wins
1937 Leeds Cup
1949 Leeds Cup
1950 Northern Professional Championship
1956 Stuart C. Goodwin Tournament (tie with Eric Brown)

Results in major championships

Note: Fallon only played in The Open Championship.

NT = No tournament
CUT = missed the half-way cut
"T" indicates a tie for a place

Team appearances
Ryder Cup (representing Great Britain): 1955, 1963 (non-playing captain)
England–Scotland Professional Match (representing Scotland): 1936, 1937, 1938
Triangular Professional Tournament (representing Scotland): 1937
Llandudno International Golf Trophy (representing Scotland): 1938

References
Alliss, Peter: "The Who's Who of Golf" (1983), Orbis Publishing Ltd, 

Scottish male golfers
Ryder Cup competitors for Europe
Sportspeople from Lanark
1913 births
1985 deaths